Max Arthur OBE (25 February 1939 – 2 May 2019) was a military historian, author and actor who specialised in first-hand recollections of the twentieth century. In particular his works focussed on the First and Second World War.

In the earlier years of his life, Arthur was an actor appearing in a number of minor roles on television. Most notably as Zuko in the  Doctor Who episode Planet of Fire. He also appeared in the film Bloodbrothers (1978 film) and the television series Grange Hill.

Later in his life he changed direction and became a historian. As a historian his scholarship focussed in drawing together testimony from soldiers of their experiences during wartime. His most noted works were Forgotten Voices of the Great War (2002) and Forgotten Voices of the Second World War (2004) both in association with the Imperial War Museum.

He also presented two television documentaries: The Brits Who Fought For Spain (2008-9), for The History Channel UK and 'Dambusters' for Optimum Releasing.

Arthur was appointed Officer of the Order of the British Empire (OBE) in the 2013 New Year Honours for services to military history.

On 2 May 2019, Arthur died of leukaemia aged 80.

Published works

References

External links
 Forgotten Voices website

1939 births
2019 deaths
British non-fiction writers
British military writers
Officers of the Order of the British Empire
People from Bognor Regis
British male writers
Male non-fiction writers